Charles Roderick Kemp (born 21 December 1944) is an Australian politician. He was a Liberal member of the Australian Senate from 1990 to 2008, representing the state of Victoria.

Kemp was born in Melbourne, Victoria, and was educated at Melbourne University, where he graduated in commerce.  He is the brother of Dr David Kemp, who was a Liberal MP from 1990 to 2004.

Before entering politics, Kemp was Director of the Institute of Public Affairs, a conservative policy body founded by his father, C.D. Kemp. He was Senior Private Secretary to the Minister for Social Security and Minister for Finance, Dame Margaret Guilfoyle, from 1977 to 1982, and Principal Adviser to the Leader of the Opposition, Andrew Peacock, in 1989.

Kemp was elected as a Liberal Senator at the 1990 election and took his seat in July 1990.  He was a member of the Opposition Shadow Ministry from 1992 to 1996, Parliamentary Secretary to the Minister for Social Security in 1996, Assistant Treasurer from 1996 to 2001, and Minister for the Arts and Sport from November 2001 to January 2007.

His brother David was a fellow minister.

On 12 May, Rod Kemp announced he would not contest the November 2007 election, and duly left parliament at the expiration of his term in June 2008.

Publications
Rod Kemp and Marion Stanton (eds), Speaking for Australia: Parliamentary speeches that shaped our nation, Allen & Unwin, 2004.

References

1944 births
Living people
Liberal Party of Australia members of the Parliament of Australia
Members of the Australian Senate
Members of the Australian Senate for Victoria
People educated at Scotch College, Melbourne
University of Melbourne alumni
21st-century Australian politicians
20th-century Australian politicians
Government ministers of Australia